Poston may refer to:

Events
Murder of Ryan Poston, a 2012 crime that occurred in Kentucky

People
Bryan A. Poston (1924–2009), American politician in Louisiana 
Charles Debrille Poston (1825–1902), American politician in Arizona
Charles M. Poston (1898–1968), American politician in Louisiana 
Elizabeth Poston (1905–1987), English composer
Freddie L. Poston (1925–2016), American lieutenant general
Jim Poston (1945–2007), governor of the Turks and Caicos Islands
Lucilla Poston, British physiologist and academic
Robert Lincoln Poston (1891–1924), American journalist
Tim Poston (1945–2017), British mathematician
Tom Poston (1921–2007), American actor

Places
 Poston, Arizona, United States
 Poston War Relocation Center, a World War II era internment camp